HD 159868 b is an extrasolar planet that orbits HD 159868. It is a jovian planet. The orbit is nearly circular at the average distance of 2.25 AU.

See also 
 HD 219828 b

References 

Scorpius (constellation)
Exoplanets discovered in 2007
Giant planets
Exoplanets detected by radial velocity